The forty-eighth season of the NBC sketch comedy series Saturday Night Live premiered on October 1, 2022, during the 2022–23 television season with host Miles Teller and musical guest Kendrick Lamar.

Cast
Eight cast members from season 47 left the show prior to the beginning of this season. The departures of longtime cast members Aidy Bryant, Pete Davidson, Kate McKinnon, and Kyle Mooney were announced during the season 47 finale. In September 2022, a few weeks prior to the start of the 48th season, the departures of Alex Moffat, Chris Redd, Melissa Villaseñor, and featured player Aristotle Athari were announced.

Returning cast member Cecily Strong took a temporary leave of absence early in the season due to her commitments to perform in the Los Angeles revival of the one-woman stage play The Search for Signs of Intelligent Life in the Universe, returning to SNL for the October 29, 2022 episode. Strong then departed several weeks later on December 17 after being on the show for eleven seasons since 2012, making her the longest-tenured female cast member in the show's history. 

On September 12, 2022, following the departures of eight cast members, executive producer Lorne Michaels called the season a "transition year". Michaels announced that four new cast members would be joining the show: stand-up comedians Marcello Hernandez, Molly Kearney (the show's first non-binary cast member), Michael Longfellow, and Devon Walker. 

Andrew Dismukes and Punkie Johnson, who were hired as featured players in season 46, were promoted to repertory status this season, while James Austin Johnson and Sarah Sherman, both of whom were hired before season 47, remained as featured players.

This season saw the death of longtime production designer Eugene Lee, who passed away on February 6, 2023, and had worked on the show since the show's premiere on October 11, 1975, with the exception of seasons 6–10 (1980–1985).

Cast roster

Repertory players
 Michael Che
 Mikey Day
 Andrew Dismukes
 Chloe Fineman
 Heidi Gardner
 Punkie Johnson
 Colin Jost
 Ego Nwodim
 Cecily Strong (final episode: December 17, 2022)
 Kenan Thompson
 Bowen Yang

Featured players
 Marcello Hernandez
 James Austin Johnson
 Molly Kearney
 Michael Longfellow
 Sarah Sherman
 Devon Walker

bold denotes "Weekend Update" anchor

Episodes

Notes

References

Cultural depictions of Joe Biden
47
Saturday Night Live in the 2020s
2022 American television seasons
2023 American television seasons